Now Bahar (also Romanized as Now Bahār) is a village in Bizaki Rural District, Golbahar District, Chenaran County, Razavi Khorasan Province, Iran. At the 2006 census, its population was 1,147, in 269 families.

References 

Populated places in Chenaran County